is a Japanese mathematician and politician and served as the mayor of the city of Hiroshima, Japan from 1999 to 2011.

Early life 
He studied mathematics at the University of Tokyo, receiving a B.S. in 1966 and an M.S. in 1968. He continued his studies under John Milnor at the Massachusetts Institute of Technology, earning his PhD in mathematics in 1970. He took teaching jobs at a series of universities: State University of New York at Stony Brook (1970), Tufts University (1972–1986), and Hiroshima Shudo University (1986–1997). His research was on topology, with an interest in homotopy groups.

While at Tufts, Akiba established the Hibakusha Travel Grant program, which brought several American print and broadcast journalists annually to Hiroshima in August, to craft stories about the city (and typically about the experiences of those exposed to the atomic bomb in 1945).

Political career
As a member of the Social Democratic Party, he was elected to the House of Representatives, and served from 1990 to 1999. He assumed office as mayor of Hiroshima in February, 1999, and was reelected to this position in 2003 and in April 2007.

Peace activities

As mayor, he has been a visible peace activist. He is active in the Mayors for Peace organization, serving as the president of their World Conference. The 2020 Vision Campaign launched in 2003, which aims to eliminate nuclear weapons, has earned Mayors for Peace the "World Citizenship Award" from the Nuclear Age Peace Foundation in 2004, the "Sean McBride" Award from the International Peace Bureau in 2006, and the Nuclear-Free Future Award from the Franz-Moll Foundation in 2007. He has also been an advocate of the abolition of nuclear weapons, and a vocal critic of George W. Bush. Since May 2007 he is also Councillor at the World Future Council.

In 2007 he received the Nuclear-Free Future Award in the solutions category.

He was longlisted for the 2008 World Mayor award, but failed to win, as the award went to Mayor Helen Zille of Cape Town, Republic of South Africa.

On January 21, 2010, he attended the 78th winter meeting of the U.S. Conference of Mayors as a special guest speaker, and in that capacity attended the reception held at the White House and met US President Barack Obama. He is so far the only serving Mayor of Hiroshima who has officially met a serving US president.

In August 2010, he received the Ramon Magsaysay Award for his advocacy for nuclear disarmament, and in April 2013 he was awarded the Otto Hahn Peace Medal from the United Nations Association of Germany (DGVN) and the Governing Mayor of Berlin.

Akiba is on the Board of Advisors of the Global Security Institute.

Hiroshima is one place outside the United States where Martin Luther King Jr. Day is observed with equal importance as in the United States. Tadatoshi Akiba holds a special banquet at the mayor's office as an act of unifying his city's call for peace with King's message of human rights.

In August 2022, he was awarded the Ahmadiyya Muslim Prize for the Advancement of Peace.

Stepping down as mayor
In the new year address on January 4, 2011, Akiba announced he would not run for reelection during the mayoral election scheduled for April 10, 2011. No reasons were given. In early April it was reported that Hiroshima University has appointed Akiba as special professor, effective from his retirement as mayor. On April 10, Kazumi Matsui was elected the new Mayor. On August 3, 2012, he was appointed chairman of the Middle Powers Initiative (MPI), an international network of non-governmental organizations working for nuclear disarmament.

Works

Translation
 Linear algebra / Ichiro Satake; translated by Sebastian Koh, Tadatoshi Akiba, Shin-ichiro Ihara

See also
List of peace activists

References

External links
 
 CityMayors.com feature
 Interview with Mayor Akiba
 Tadatoshi Akiba awarded Otto Hahn Peace Medal in Berlin  
  Tadatoshi Akiba received German Peace Award in Berlin

1942 births
People from Arakawa, Tokyo
Living people
Mayors of Hiroshima
Japanese educators
20th-century Japanese mathematicians
21st-century Japanese mathematicians
Massachusetts Institute of Technology School of Science alumni
Politicians from Tokyo
Tufts University faculty
University of Tokyo alumni
Japanese anti–nuclear weapons activists
Members of the House of Representatives (Japan)
Social Democratic Party (Japan) politicians
Ramon Magsaysay Award winners
Academic staff of Hiroshima University
Recipients of the Ahmadiyya Muslim Peace Prize